6+Plaza is a shopping mall complex located in Zhubei City, Hsinchu County, Taiwan that started trial operations on 28 December 2017 and officially opened on 26 January 2018. It is the first and largest shopping mall in Hsinchu County and is located in close proximity to Hsinchu HSR station. The mall has many popular brands, informal eateries as well as kids' activities, such as go-karting. The mall is a part of a highrise complex named 暐順經貿大樓 that includes a mall (Levels 1 - 5), office spaces (Levels 6 - 13) as well as a hotel (Levels 14 - 20).

See also
 List of tourist attractions in Taiwan

References

External links

2018 establishments in Taiwan
Shopping malls in Zhubei
Shopping malls established in 2018
Buildings and structures in Hsinchu County